George Abel Simmons (September 8, 1791 – October 27, 1857) was a U.S. Representative from New York.

Biography
Born in Lyme, New Hampshire, Simmons attended the district school. He was graduated from Dartmouth College, Hanover, New Hampshire, in 1816. He moved to Lansingburgh, New York, and was principal of the local academy. He studied law. He was admitted to the bar in 1825 and commenced practice in Keeseville, New York. He served as member of the state assembly in 1840–1842. He served as member of the state constitutional convention in 1846.

Simmons was elected as a Whig to the Thirty-third Congress and reelected as an Opposition Party candidate to the Thirty-fourth Congress (March 4, 1853 – March 3, 1857). He served as chairman of the Committee on the Judiciary (Thirty-fourth Congress). He was not a candidate for reelection in 1856. He resumed the practice of his profession in Keeseville, New York, where he died October 27, 1857. He was interred in Evergreen Cemetery.

Sources

External links

 

1791 births
1857 deaths
People from Lyme, New Hampshire
Whig Party members of the United States House of Representatives from New York (state)
19th-century American politicians
Opposition Party members of the United States House of Representatives from New York (state)
People from Keeseville, New York
People from Lansingburgh, New York
Dartmouth College alumni